USS MacKenzie (DD-614) was a  in the United States Navy during World War II. She was the third ship named for Lieutenant Commander Alexander Slidell MacKenzie.

MacKenzie was laid down 29 May 1941 by the Bethlehem Shipbuilding, San Pedro, California; launched 27 June 1942; sponsored by Miss Gail Nielsen, descendant of Lieutenant Commander MacKenzie; and commissioned 21 November 1942.

Service history
MacKenzie transited the Panama Canal 1 March 1943, after completion of shakedown and training cruises, and continued on to spend her entire World War II career in the Atlantic and Mediterranean theaters. She arrived at Casco Bay, Maine, 13 March and commenced coastwise escort duties. In May, she graduated to transatlantic convoy assignments, completing two voyages to the Mediterranean Sea by the end of June.

Relieved of transatlantic duties at the end of June, she reported to the staging area for the “Cent” Attack Force, one of three such forces to initiate the Sicilian campaign. On 9 July she departed the north African coast, arriving at Scoglitti, Sicily, the next day to screen the transport vessels and provide fire support. Three days later, the destroyer returned to convoy duty, conducting convoys between the United States and the Mediterranean until 7 October, and then engaging in escort work between North America and the United Kingdom. After repairs at Swansea, Wales, in the late autumn, she made two more ocean crossings before beginning operations in the Mediterranean.

On 18 March 1944, MacKenzie steamed into the harbor at Naples to report for screening, fire support and antisubmarine patrol duties in conjunction with the Anzio operation. Starting her Anzio assignments with an assist in the sinking of a two-man submarine on the 19th, she continued to provide support on this front until resuming convoy duties 6 June. Taking up the offensive again in August, MacKenzie took part in Operation Dragoon, providing fire support for this invasion of southern France. On 15 September, she departed the Mediterranean and headed for Boston, Massachusetts and a 5-month repair and overhaul period.

The destroyer took up duty in the Mediterranean again in February 1945 and from 28 March through 21 April spent her days in the bombardment of the Franco-Italian border and her nights on the blockade of the Gulf of Genoa. In May, having assisted in the continuance of an effective second front, MacKenzie was assigned to convoy duty in the Strait of Gibraltar. She remained in the Mediterranean after the capitulation of the Third Reich, cruising its waters until returning to the United States in July.

Upon her arrival, MacKenzie underwent overhaul preparatory to going to the Pacific. But, with the end of Pacific hostilities in mid-August, her orders were changed and on 4 November she entered the Charleston Navy Yard for inactivation. She decommissioned 4 February 1946 and in January 1947 entered the reserve fleet at Philadelphia, Pennsylvania. She was struck from the Naval Vessel Register on 1 July 1971 and sunk in fleet exercises on 1 June 1974.

Awards
MacKenzie received four battle stars for World War II service.

References

External links
 Photo gallery at navsource.org
 Photo gallery at Naval Historical Center

 

Benson-class destroyers
Ships built in Los Angeles
1942 ships
World War II destroyers of the United States